ACM SIGOPS is the Association for Computing Machinery's Special Interest Group on Operating Systems, an international community of students, faculty, researchers, and practitioners associated with research and development related to operating systems. The organization sponsors prestigious international conferences related to computer systems, operating systems, computer architectures, distributed computing, and virtual environments. In addition, the organization offers multiple awards recognizing outstanding participants in the field, including the Dennis M. Ritchie Doctoral Dissertation Award, in honor of Dennis Ritchie, co-creator of the renowned C programming language and Unix operating system.

History
In 1965, Henriette Avram started the ACM Special Interest Committee on Time-Sharing (SICTIME), and Arthur M. Rosenberg became the first chair. In 1968, the name was changed to ACM SIGOPS. By 1969, the organization included nearly 1000 members.

Conferences
ACM SIGOPS sponsors the following industry conferences, some independently and some in partnership with industry participants such as ACM SIGPLAN, USENIX, Oracle, Microsoft, and VMWare.
 APSYS: Asia-Pacific Workshop on Systems 
 ASPLOS: International Conference on Architectural Support for Programming Languages and Operating Systems
 EuroSys: European Conference on Computer Systems 
 OSDI: USENIX Symposium on Operating Systems Design and Implementation
 PODC: Symposium on Principles of Distributed Computing
 SOCC: International Symposium on Cloud Computing 
 SOSP: Symposium on Operating Systems Principles 
 SYSTOR: ACM International Systems and Storage Conference 
 VEE: International Conference on Virtual Execution Environments

Hall of Fame
ACM SIGOPS includes a Hall of Fame Award, started in 2005, recognizing influential papers from ten or more years in the past.  Notable recipients include:
 Leslie Lamport (2013)
 Barbara Liskov (2012)
 Richard Rashid
 Dennis Ritchie (2002)

Journal
ACM SIGOPS publishes the Operating Systems Review (OSR), a forum for topics including operating systems and architecture for multiprogramming, multiprocessing, and time-sharing, and computer system modeling and analysis.

See also

 Cloud computing
 Computer engineering
 Computer multitasking
 Computer science
 Computing
 Kernel
 List of operating systems
 Operating system
 Timeline of operating systems
 Virtual machine

References

External links
 SIGOPS
 Association ACM SIGOPS France

Association for Computing Machinery Special Interest Groups
International professional associations